Richmond Road is a major north-south artery along the East Shore of the New York City borough of Staten Island.

Route description
Parts of Richmond Road along with all of Vanderbilt Avenue and all of Amboy Road form Staten Island's colonial-era eastern corridor that predates the newer, straighter, and wider Hylan Boulevard. The three roads that make up the corridor share a common numbering system, i.e. Richmond Road's numbers start where Vanderbilt Avenue's leave off and Amboy Road's numbers start where Amboy Road forks away from Richmond Road. This numbering system includes the numerically highest of street addresses in New York City.

Other roads that fork off of the Richmond Road corridor are St. Paul's Avenue, Van Duzer Street, Targee Street, Rockland Avenue, Bloomingdale Road, Pleasant Plains Avenue, and Richmond Valley Road.

Transportation
Richmond Road is served by the  local buses, as well as the  express bus. The  local buses also cover a portion of the route.

History
Richmond Road dates back to the early 1700s, laid out as part of the "Public Common General Road", and was likely a Native American footpath prior to that.

Major intersections

References

Streets in Staten Island